Eckhard Löll (born 1 March 1954) is a sailor from Oberhausen, West-Germany, who represented his country at the 1984 Summer Olympics in Los Angeles, United States as crew member in the Soling. With helmsman Willi Kuhweide and fellow crew member Axel May they took the 8th place.

References

Living people
1954 births
Sailors at the 1984 Summer Olympics – Soling
Olympic sailors of West Germany
Sportspeople from Oberhausen
German male sailors (sport)